The 2002 Critérium du Dauphiné Libéré was the 54th edition of the cycle race and was held from 9 June to 16 June 2002. The race started in Lyon and finished in Geneva. The race has no overall winner. Although Lance Armstrong originally won the event, he was stripped of the title due to violating anti-doping rules. In 2012, the United States Anti-Doping Agency disqualified him from his results after 1 August 1998. The verdict was confirmed by the UCI.

Teams
Fourteen teams, containing a total of 110 riders, participated in the race:

Route

General classification

Notes

References

Further reading

External links

2002
2002 in French sport
June 2002 sports events in France